Barton R. Voigt (born 1949) was Chief Justice of the Wyoming Supreme Court between the years 2006 and 2010.

Voigt moved to Thermopolis, Wyoming as a child and was raised there. He obtained a B.A. and M.A. in American History, as well as a J.D., at the University of Wyoming. He practiced law in Thermopolis for ten years, serving as Hot Springs County attorney for two terms. After two years as a county judge in Gillette, he spent the next eight years as a district judge in Douglas. He was appointed to the court on March 29, 2001, and became Chief Justice on July 1, 2006.

He retired from the Wyoming Supreme Court in January 2014.

References

Living people
American jurists
Justices of the Wyoming Supreme Court
University of Wyoming alumni
People from Thermopolis, Wyoming
1949 births
People from Douglas, Wyoming
Chief Justices of the Wyoming Supreme Court